Moreton Say is a small village and sparsely populated civil parish in Shropshire, England, near the borders with Cheshire and Staffordshire, just northwest of the town of Market Drayton. It is sometimes spelled Moreton Saye or Moreton Sea.
The civil parish, which also covers the hamlets of Longford and Longslow, had a total population of 429 at the 2001 census, increasing to 485 at the 2011 Census.

There are no shops or services within the village. As a result, the only employment opportunities are at the local primary school, a residential home, and surrounding farms.

Robert Clive, 1st Baron Clive, "Clive of India", who is credited with securing India and the wealth that followed for the British crown was born in the parish at Styche Hall and is buried in St Margaret's Church.

Every year the village holds a flower and produce show during summer, where villagers and people from the local community can compete in many classes such as best vegetable and fruit, flowers, crafts, and cookery as well as other classes.

Parish Church
St Margaret's Church, dedicated to St Margaret of Antioch, dates back to the 12th century, when it was founded as a chapel of Hodnet,
It is a brick structure which was completed in 1788.
It comprises a chancel and nave, with a porch to the south and a square steeple tower to the west which contains two bells, which were left to the parishioners by the commissioners of Edward VI in 1553, along with another small bell as well as a silver chalice and paten.

The interior of the church contains several monuments of the Vernon, Clive and Corser families, one of which is a modern memorial to Robert Clive, who is recorded in the parish register as having been baptised on 2 October 1725, and buried at the church on 30 November 1774, there is also a 17th-century tomb to John Bostock and Jane his wife.

Within the Churchyard Extension, next to the road, is the parish war memorial in form of an ornate carved stone cross, with names of dead from World War I on the obverse, and those of World War II dead on the reverse.

Moreton Say parish, which covers an area of nearly 6000 acres, includes the villages of Longford, Bletchley, Styche with Woodlands, and Tern Hill. The parish is in the diocese of Lichfield which also includes the parishes of Ash, Adderley, Ightfield and Calverhall.

Education
Moreton Say C.E. Controlled Primary School
Moreton Say Primary School is a coeducational Church of England controlled primary school with 90 pupils on roll, separated into four classes of mixed ages of two-year groups in each, and is maintained by Shropshire Council. It is located in its original buildings which were completed in 1871, along with an extension built in 2003 to house the Goslings Nursery class, and an extension to the offices in 2006. The School's last inspection by Ofsted identified them as good (Grade 2) in most criteria, meaning "These are very positive features of a school. A school that is good is serving its pupils well".

Secondary School

Demographics

Population
At the time of the first census in 1801 the population of the village was 683, the population reached its peak of 858 in the year of 1901, ever since it has been declining to 429 in 2001. With the lack of employment in the village itself many people moved to towns and cities, such as Market Drayton.

Industry
Generally in the village a majority of the population has been employed in agriculture, at present this is still a sector where a lot of people work in as well as the service sector, although with no shops or businesses in the village around half the working population commutes outside of the village to their place of work.

Transport

There is at present no public transport regularly to or from the village.

Climate

See also
Listed buildings in Moreton Say

References

External links

 Moreton Say Parish Website
 Moreton Say on A Vision of Britain Through Time
 Neighbourhood Statistics on Office for National Statistics

Villages in Shropshire